Scopula paneliusi is a moth species of the family Geometridae first described by Claude Herbulot in 1957. It is endemic to Cape Verde.

Subspecies
Scopula paneliusi paneliusi Herbulot, 1957 (Cape Verde: Santo Antão, Santiago, Fogo)
Scopula paneliusi subirrorata Herbulot, 1957 (Cape Verde: São Vicente, São Nicolau, Brava)

References

Moths described in 1957
paneliusi
Moths of Cape Verde
Moths of Africa